

#

2Cellos
The 440 Alliance
65daysofstatic

A

Acoustic Alchemy
Adebisi Shank
And So I Watch You From Afar
Andy James
Angel Vivaldi
Animals as Leaders
Apocalyptica
Apollo 100
The Aristocrats
Audiomachine
Austin TV

B

The Bakerton Group
Because of Ghosts
Behold... The Arctopus
The Bel-Airs
Bell Orchestre
Billy Mahonie
The Black Mages
Blotted Science 
Boards of Canada
Bond
Bongripper
Bohren & der Club of Gore
Booker T. & the MG's
Bozzio Levin Stevens
Break of Reality
Buckethead
Budos Band

C

The Cancer Conspiracy
Caspian
The Champs
The Chantays
Chon
Chromelodeon
Codes in the Clouds
Conquering Dystopia
Cougar
Crime in Choir

D

Davie Allan & the Arrows
Delay Tactics
Delvon Lamarr Organ Trio
Depapepe
Dirty Three
Disen Gage
Djam Karet
Do Make Say Think
Don Caballero
Dub Trio
Dysrhythmia

E

E.S. Posthumus
Earth
Earthless
El Ten Eleven
Electro Quarterstaff
Erotic Cakes
Errors
Explosions in the Sky

F

The Fearless Flyers
Finch
The Fireballs
Flying Lotus
Fourplay
Friends of Dean Martinez
From Monument to Masses
The Fucking Champs
Füxa

G

Ghosts and Vodka
Ghost-Note
Gifts From Enola
Giraffes? Giraffes!
The Glitch Mob
God is an Astronaut
Godspeed You! Black Emperor
Gone
Gontiti
Grails

H

Haiku Salut
Hella

I

If These Trees Could Talk
Immediate Music
Intervals
Intronaut
Isotope 217

J

Jakob
John5
Jon Finn Group
Joy Wants Eternity

K

Karma to Burn
Kinski
Kitaro
Kostarev Group
Kutumba

L

Labradford
Laika & the Cosmonauts
Lanterna
Liquid Tension Experiment
The Lively Ones
Long Distance Calling
Lymbyc Systym

M

Maserati
Maybeshewill
The Mercury Program
The Mermen
Metavari
Midnight Syndicate
Mindflayer
Minibosses
Mogwai
Mono
Moonlit Sailor

N

Nox Arcana

O

The Octopus Project
Odyssey
Orbital
The Outlaws
OXES
Ozric Tentacles

P

Pele
Pelican
Pell Mell
Penguin Cafe Orchestra
The Piano Guys
Piglet
Planet X
Plini
Polyphia
Port Blue
Powerglove
Public Service Broadcasting

R

Rachel's
Rain
Ratatat
Red Sparowes
The Redneck Manifesto
The Roots of Orchis
Rovo
Russian Circles

S

Saxon Shore
Scale the Summit
Secret Chiefs 3
Serpent Throne
The Shadows
Shadowy Men on a Shadowy Planet
Shalabi Effect
The Six Parts Seven
Snarky Puppy
Skeletonbreath
Sky
Sleeping People
Solaris
Sons of Alpha Centauri
Sound Tribe Sector 9
The Spotnicks
Stars of the Lid
Steve Morse Band
Stinking Lizaveta
Los Straitjackets
Strawberry Girls
SubArachnoid Space
The Surf Coasters
The Surfaris

T

Talkdemonic
Tarentel
This Patch of Sky
This Will Destroy You
Three Trapped Tigers
Toe
Toiling Midgets
Tommy & The Tom Toms
Tom's Story
The Tornados
Tortoise
Trans-Siberian Orchestra
Tribal Tech
Tristeza
Two Steps From Hell

U

Unwed Sailor

V

 Vangelis
 The Ventures
 Vitamin String Quartet

W

We Be the Echo
Weather Report
Windsor Airlift
Wizardzz

X

X-Ray Dog

Y

Yawning Man
Yndi Halda
Yowie

Z

Zombi

Instrumental